Skid Kids is a 1953 black and white British film directed by Don Chaffey and starring Barry MacGregor and Anthony Lang. It was produced by the Children's Film Foundation.

Plot

The film centres on the Clarke family: Mr Clarke is a taxi driver and “Swanky” Clarke is his teenage son.

A group of young urban teenagers creates a cycle racing club called the Burton Bullets. They create a "speedway track" on local waste ground.

Meanwhile a criminal gang is systematically stealing dozens of cycles in the same area. The police come to check the numerous bikes used by the club.

When Swanky's bike is stolen from outside a shop he gives chase and ends up being kidnapped. The club members try to track him down. Some of the missing bikes are spotted at Joe's and Joe starts throwing bikes in the canal to hide the evidence.

The police help the club and the bike thieves are caught.

Locations

The film is made in south-east London around the Ralph Street and Dickens Square area.

Cast
Barry MacGregor as Swankey Clarke
Anthony Lang as Bobby Reynolds
Peter Neil as Police Constable
Tom Walls Jr as Mr. Clarke
Angela Monk as Sylvia Clarke
Kurt Wagener as Antonio the sculptor
Hilda Fenemore as Mrs Clarke

References

External links

1953 films
Films directed by Don Chaffey
1953 directorial debut films
British black-and-white films
British drama films
1953 drama films
1950s English-language films
1950s British films